Adila Sedraïa (born 26 June 1984), known as Indila, is a French singer and songwriter. She collaborated with many musicians on vocals and songwriting prior to releasing her first single, "Dernière danse" ("Last Dance"), in November 2013, which reached SNEP Top 2 in France. She released her first album Mini World in February 2014.

Early life
Adila Sedraïa was born on 26 June 1984, in Paris. Her mother was a caregiver, while her grandmother sang at weddings; she has two older sisters. Indila describes herself as a "child of the world" as she is Algerian and a bit Egyptian, Cambodian and Indian descent. Prior to her singing career, she worked as a tour guide at the Marché international de Rungis. She explained that her stage name comes from her insatiable love for India.

In addition to her native French, Indila has provided vocals in English, including "Dreamin" with Youssoupha and "Bye Bye Sonyé" with DJ Abdel, and sung Hindi-language refrains in Criminel by TLF and Thug mariage by Rohff.

Career 
Her meeting with record producer Skalpovich allowed her to enter into the world of rap and eventually collaborations with several French rappers. Indila began her music career around 2009, providing vocals for (among others) Invitaation by Vitaa, "Trinité" by L'Algérino, "Thug mariage" by Rohff, "Hiro" by Soprano, and composing "J'ai besoin d'y croire" sung by Admiral T. "Hiro" was her first successful collaboration, reaching number 26 in the charts in France and 27 in Belgium. She continued to collaborate with several other French rappers and DJs over the next three years, including "Poussière d'empire" with Nessbeal, "Criminel" with TLF, "Press pause" with OGB, "Bye Bye Sonyé" with DJ Abdel, "Dreamin" with Youssoupha—which peaked in July 2012 at number 14 in France's SNEP charts—and "Ma Reine" with Axel Tony. She also composed the songs Plus Haut by Matt Pokora along with "Avec Toi" by Axel Tony featuring Tunisiano, in which she is credited by her real name "Adila Sedraïa". "Avec toi", which was produced by Skalp, reached number 7 in the charts in France in November 2012.

In November 2013, Indila released her first single—"Dernière danse" ("Last Dance"), from the album Mini World—which quickly found success. It reached the top 10 of the French charts on 4 January 2014 and reached number 2 on 18 January, where it remained through the week of 22 March. The song remained in the top 200 in France through April 2015, for a total of 77 weeks in the top 200. It was also a success outside France; by the end of February 2014, "Dernière danse" was the number one song on iTunes in Greece and Romania, and the number two song on iTunes in Turkey.

In February 2014, Indila released her first album, Mini World, which was produced by Skalp. In addition to "Dernière danse", two other singles from the album reached the top-20 in the charts in France: "Tourner dans le vide" ("Spinning in the Emptiness"), which reached number 13, and "S.O.S", which reached number 8. The album was the number 1 best-selling album in France the week of its debut and remained in the top-10 best-selling albums through the week of 11 October. A limited-edition CD/DVD version of Mini World was released in November 2014, with two new songs, orchestral versions of "Tourner dans le vide" and "Love Story", an acoustic version of "S.O.S", and videos of live performances of several tracks from the album. A second limited-edition release of Mini World in February 2015 contained the ten tracks from the original release, the two new songs from the first limited edition, and another new song. Mini World found success both in France, where it was the third-best-selling album of 2014, and outside the country, where it was the best-seller of 2014 in Poland and second-best-seller of 2014 in Belgium.

In October 2014, Indila won the MTV Europe Music Award for Best French Artist of 2014. She won Best New Album of the Year award (for Mini World) at the 30th Victoires de la Musique in February 2015. Indila was among the ten artists to receive the European Border Breakers Award in 2015.

On 23 August 2019, Indila returned with her new song "Parle à ta tête". On 14 November, the music video for the song was released.

In April 2021, Amir's single Carrousel is a duet with Indila.

In January 2023, Zaho unveils the track Roi 2 cœurs in duet with Indila, on her album Résilience.

Artistry 
Indila's vocal range spans from F3 – D#5 and has alto type.

She has cited Enrico Macias as her first musical influence, with others influences being Michael Jackson, Ismaël Lo, Buika, Warda, Jacques Brel, Lata Mangeshkar.

Discography

Studio albums

Singles

Other charted songs

As featured artist 

*Did not appear in the official Belgian Ultratop 50 charts, but rather in the bubbling under Ultratip charts.

Other vocals

Songwriting credits 
Besides songs appearing in Mini World and "Parle à ta tête", Indila is credited as a songwriter in the following songs:
 2010: "Poussière d'empire" by Nessbeal feat. Indila
 2010: "J'ai besoin d'y croire" by Admiral T feat. Awa Imani
 2010: "Thug mariage" by Rohff feat. Indila
 2011: "Bye Bye Sonyé" by DJ Abdel feat. Indila
 2012: "Avec toi" by Axel Tony featuring Tunisiano
 2012: "Plus haut" by M. Pokora
 2012: "Plus jamais" by Sultan
 2012: "Dreamin'" by Youssoupha feat. Indila & Skalpovitch
 2013: "Ma reine" by Axel Tony feat. Admiral T
 2016: "Baila" by Ishtar
 2016: "Pour toi et moi" by Ishtar
 2021: "Carrousel" by Amir feat. Indila.

Notes

References 

1984 births
French women pop singers
French people of Indian descent
French people of Algerian descent
Living people
French people of Cambodian descent
French people of Egyptian descent
Singers from Paris
French folk-pop singers
21st-century French singers
21st-century French women singers
MTV Europe Music Award winners